The Country Teacher is a 2008 Czech drama film directed and written by Bohdan Sláma.

Cast 
 Pavel Liška – Teacher
 Zuzana Bydžovská – Marie
 Ladislav Šedivý – Boy
 Marek Daniel – Boyfriend
 Tereza Voříšková – Beruska
 Cyril Drozda - Headmaster
 Marie Ludvíková - Headmaster's wife
 Zuzana Kronerová - Mother
 Miroslav Krobot - Father

References

External links 

2008 films
2008 drama films
Czech LGBT-related films
Czech Lion Awards winners (films)
Czech drama films
2000s Czech films
2000s Czech-language films